Anaphosia pectinata is a moth of the subfamily Arctiinae. It was described by George Hampson in 1910. It is found in the Democratic Republic of the Congo.

References

Moths described in 1910
Lithosiini
Moths of Africa
Endemic fauna of the Democratic Republic of the Congo